Ganesh Chalisa ("Forty chaupais on Ganesh") is a Hindu devotional hymn (stotra) addressed to Lord Ganesh. Literally it is forty Chaupais on Lord Ganesh. It is written in the Awadhi language. The Ganesh Chalisa has gained enormous popularity among the modern-day Hindus. Many of them recite it daily as a prayer.

Each of the forty verses of the Ganesh Chalisa conveys one particular form of blessing and, depending on the Bhava or Shraddha (faith and devotion) of the devotee, how the fruits of the particular verse are attained.

External links
 Ganesh Chalisa in English rhyme
Ganesh Chalisa text.
ganesh chalisa ke fayede jaibhole.co.in
Ganesh Chalisa in Hindi Ganesh Chalisa

References

Hindu texts
Hindi-language literature
Hindu music